Diocese of Mumbai may refer to:

 Mumbai Orthodox Diocese
 Roman Catholic Archdiocese of Bombay
 Diocese of Mumbai (Church of North India)